Mitchell Stephens may refer to:

Mitchell Stephens (academic) (born 1949), American university professor and author
Mitchell Stephens (ice hockey) (born 1997), Canadian ice hockey player